Sim Sung-young (born 14 October 1992) is a South Korean basketball player for Cheongju KB Stars and the South Korean national team.

She participated at the 2018 FIBA Women's Basketball World Cup.

References

External links

1992 births
Living people
Guards (basketball)
People from Gwangju
South Korean women's basketball players